Y Tauri is a carbon star located in the constellation Taurus. Parallax measurements by Gaia put it at a distance of approximately 2,170 light-years (670 parsecs).

Y Tauri is a semiregular variable star. Its class is SRb, and its primary pulsation cycle lasts 241.5 days. No long secondary period has been identified. Its mass is calculated to be .

References 

Semiregular variable stars
Scutum (constellation)
Tauri, Y
Carbon stars
Durchmusterung objects
038307
027181
1977
TIC objects